The 1925 Oldenburg state election was held on 24 May 1925 to elect the 40 members of the Landtag of the Free State of Oldenburg.

Results

References

Oldenburg
Elections in Lower Saxony